The St. Albans Post Office, also known as Old St. Albans Post Office, is a historic post office building located at 202 Sixth Ave. in St. Albans, Kanawha County, West Virginia.  It was built in 1937, and is a one-story, five bay brick building with a metal hip roof in Colonial Revival style.  A rear addition was built about 1955. It was designed by the Office of the Supervising Architect under Louis A. Simon and Supervising Engineer Neal A. Melick.

It was listed on the National Register of Historic Places in 1994.

See also 
List of United States post offices

References 

Buildings and structures in Kanawha County, West Virginia
Colonial Revival architecture in West Virginia
Government buildings completed in 1937
National Register of Historic Places in Kanawha County, West Virginia
Post office buildings on the National Register of Historic Places in West Virginia
St. Albans, West Virginia